Robert Mazza is a judge of the Court of Appeal of the Supreme Court of Western Australia and former judge of the District Court of Western Australia. Before his appointment he founded his own law firm. He is a graduate of the University of Western Australia.

References

Judges of the Supreme Court of Western Australia
Living people
Year of birth missing (living people)
Judges of the District Court of Western Australia
21st-century Australian judges